This is a list of Malaysian football transfers for the 2014 second transfer window. Moves featuring Malaysia Super League, Malaysia Premier League and Malaysia FAM Cup club are listed.

2014 second transfer window opened on 23 March and closed on 22 April.

The first transfer window began once clubs had concluded their final domestic fixture of the 2014 season, but many transfers will only officially go through on 1 December onwards because the majority of player contracts finish on 31 October.

2014 Second Transfers 
All clubs without a flag are Malaysian. Otherwise it will be stated.

Transfers

Loans

Unattached Players

Notes

References

2014 2
Tranfers
Malaysia